Borgo Maggiore is one of the 9 communes or castelli of San Marino. It lies at the foot of Monte Titano and has a population of 6,871 (May 2018), making it the second largest town of San Marino, after Dogana.

Etymology
From Italian borgo ("village, hamlet") + maggiore ("bigger, greater; major").

Geography
It borders the  San Marino municipalities Serravalle, Domagnano, Faetano, Fiorentino, San Marino City, and Acquaviva and the Italian municipality Verucchio.

History
The area was previously called Mercatale ("marketplace") and remains today the most important market town in San Marino. A cable car allows Monte Titano to be scaled up to the town of San Marino. Though it is not the most populated, the Market, as well as the connection to San Marino City, make it very much a city-like shopping hub.

Parishes
Borgo Maggiore has 6 parishes (curazie):
Cà Melone, Cà Rigo, Cailungo, San Giovanni sotto le Penne, Valdragone, Ventoso

Points of interest
Piazza Grande, town square
Only heliport in San Marino

Notable inhabitants
Alessandra Perilli (born 1988), Sanmarinese Olympic medallist (sport shooting)
Manuel Poggiali (born 1983), Sanmarinese motorcycle racer

References

External links

 
Municipalities of San Marino